James Dolliver may refer to:
 James I. Dolliver (1894–1978), U.S. Representative from Iowa
 James M. Dolliver (judge) (1924–2004), American lawyer, politician and Washington Supreme Court judge
 James M. Dolliver (pilot) (1818–1896), American Boston maritime pilot